Hemnagar Union is a union of Gopalpur Upazila, Tangail District, Bangladesh.

The area is named for Hem Chandra Chowdhury, a zamindar who built his palace, Hemnagar Zamindar Bari, there in 1890.

Demographics
According to the 2011 Bangladesh census, Hemnagar Union had 8,331 households and a population of 33,398. The literacy rate (age 7 and over) was 45.9% (male: 48.1%, female: 43.9%).

See also
 Union Councils of Tangail District

References

Populated places in Tangail District
Unions of Gopalpur Upazila